The 1983–84 Balkans Cup was an edition of the Balkans Cup, a football competition for representative clubs from the Balkan states. 

Since no clubs from Albania, Greece, or Yugoslavia entered, Group B was scratched and Beroe Stara Zagora, the winners of Group A, were awarded the trophy.

Group A

References

External links 

 RSSSF Archive → Balkans Cup
 
 Mehmet Çelik. "Balkan Cup". Turkish Soccer

1983
1983–84 in European football
1983–84 in Romanian football
1983–84 in Greek football
1983–84 in Bulgarian football
1983–84 in Turkish football
1983–84 in Yugoslav football
1983–84 in Albanian football